Igor Caetano Menezes Trindade, known as Igor Caetano (born 5 July 1995) is a Brazilian football player.

Club career
He made his professional debut in the Campeonato Gaúcho for Santa Cruz on 24 March 2012 in a game against Canoas.

References

1995 births
Living people
Brazilian footballers
Brazilian expatriate footballers
Futebol Clube Santa Cruz players
S.C.U. Torreense players
U.D. Leiria players
SC Mirandela players
Sociedade Esportiva Recreativa e Cultural Brasil players
Association football midfielders
Brazilian expatriate sportspeople in Portugal
Expatriate footballers in Portugal